The College and Association of Respiratory Therapists of Alberta is a corporation with delegated provincial government authority to regulate the profession of respiratory therapy pursuant with the Health Professions Act and the Respiratory Therapists Profession Regulation.

Affiliated groups 
 Canadian Society of Respiratory Therapists
 Canadian Board for Respiratory Therapy
 Manitoba Association of Registered Respiratory Therapists
 College of Respiratory Therapists of Ontario

See also 
 American Association for Respiratory Care

References 

Medical associations based in Canada
Pulmonology and respiratory therapy organizations
Professional associations based in Alberta